Sheffield has a large population of amateur, working and professional visual artists.

Artists linked with Sheffield from the 19th to 21st century include John Ruskin (1819-1900),A Stevens (1817- 1875) G Sykes (1825-1860) J Sykes (1866-1941)A White (1865-1953) CEWilson(1853-1941),WH Young(1868-1920)  A Holland(1861-1935),H Hoyland (1896-1947),C Mozley(1914-1989),WHPiggott,CGRoe,D Jagger (1891-1958)HLAllen(1894-1958),Leonard Beaumont(1911-1995),Edward Billin (1911-1995) the last President of Sheffield Society of Artists,George H Constantine (1878-1969),Frank Constantine (1919-) J Dowd (1883-1956),Edith Jagger(1896-1975),W Rothenstein (1872-1945),Stanley Royle (1888-1961),F Saltfleet(1860-1937),Jean Saltfleet (1861-1941)K Steel(1906-1973),Margaret Shaw(1917-1983) T WWard(1918-2000) W S Taylor(1920-2010)Brian Fielding(1933-1986) George Fullard A.R.A(1923-1973) one of the award winners in the Junior Section of the first John Moores Liverpool biennial exhibition in 1957,'a landmark in British Art' for his sculpture 'Running Woman' now sited in the grounds of Upper Chapel Norfolk Street,Sheffield (note after 1961 conditions of entry for John Moores prize excluded sculpture),Jack Smith (1928-2011) (in 1956 with 3 other 'kichen sink' painters represented  Britain at Venice Biennale,first prize winner of the first  John Moores Liverpool  exhibition  in 1957 for the painting 'Creation and Crucifixion'), Derrick Greaves(1927-2022)( in 1956 represented Britain at Venice Biennale and  a winner of a special prize in the first John Moores Liverpool exhibition in 1957 , in same year visited Russia and awarded gold medal for painting at Moscow Youth Festival)  ,John Hoyland R.A.(1934-2011) (first prize winner of the John Moores Liverpool exhibition in 1982 for his painting 'Broken Bride') ,Edward Camplin(1957-2012)Bill Kirby,Brian Peacock,Trevor Faulkner,G Cunningham,Sarah Stratton,Jane Percival,Terry Lee,Rosie Lee,Kenneth Draper R.A.,Endre Roeder, Martin Decent,Mary Noble,Bill Kirby,Kate Rose,Martin Rose,Trevor Neal,Paul Morrison,Terry Gorman,Gordon Snee(1931-2013),David Speir (1921-2012) Hilda(Lilla) Speir (1915-2007)Paul Schatzberger (1950-2021)(gold award Art in the Gardens Sheffield in 2011,First prize ,British Horological Institute Photographic Competition 2016),BW Jervis,Corinna Button (''conquers our imagination by placing a perennial mirror into our collective human experience''curator qoute at Zhou B Art Centre in Chicago USA),Rosalind Nashashibi (Turner prize nominee 2017),Jamie Crewe (Turner prize nominee 2020),Haroon Mirza (winner Northern Art Prize 2010;Silver Lion Award at Venice Biennale in 2017), Mandy Payne ( a prize winner at 2014 John Moores Painting Prize ,described as 'the Oscars of British painting', for 'Brutal', a painting in aerosols on concrete,winner of Valeria Sykes award 2016),Joanna Whittle (first prize winner of 2019 Contemporary British Painting Prize winner of Valeria Sykes award 2020),Conor Rogers (1st prize at UK Young Artist of the Year in 2019 announced at Saatchi gallery),Andrew Hunt (exhibited in 2008 BP Portrait Prize exhibition,at National Portrait Gallery)Tim Rose,Trish O'Shea,Sarah Sharpe,Juliet Forrest,Jane Walker,Manish Harijan (won 'Life long Learning award' in 2019 at Sheffield Hallam university),Leslie Cornthwaite (Judges Prize ,i.e. best in exhibition for' Pots and jugs' at 2014 ' Art in the Gardens',the largest outdoor exhibition of art in the North,held annually at Botanical Gardens,Sheffield),Gill Gathercole,Karen Sherwood,Lynn Hodnett (winner of British Airways Young Achievers in Art prize), Andy Cropper,Sean Williams,Brian Holland,Bing Jones,Lavinia Jones,PhilLockwood,Mary Sewell,Kate Wells,Roanna Wells,Nick Deacon,Annette Petch,Lynn Wilkinson,Wendy Carlton,Mark H Wilson,Katherine Rhodes,Cath Dunn,Steve Elliott,Trevor Neal,Helen Parsley,Brian Robinson,Maggie Robinson,Jean Luce,Lizzy Alegeswaran,Viv Keel,Kristan Baggaley,John Brokenshire,Kay Aitch,Andrew Vickers,Jill Ray,Sue Nichol,Jason Heptonsell,Dawn Ireland,Sue Lancaster,Alison Tydesley,Annette Petch, Jane Horton,Graham Shapley,Stephen Todd,Stephen Court(Societe Dante Alighari Award in Italy for International Culture and Visual Arts and is on a You Tube documentary) ,Isabel Blincow MBE,Val Hudson,Colleen Penny,James Green,Nikki Dennett,Anna Murray,Francis Lee,Beryl Brown,Caroline Egglestone,Nicole Bird,A Parnell,Bryn Hughes(winner of Sheffield Prize in 2004 & 2010 at Great Sheffield Art show & prize winner in 2004,2005,2011,2014 and 2016 at Sheffield Arts in the Gardens,the largest outdoor exhibition in the North of England),Emily Musgrove, Jim Howieson,Roanna Wells,Anna Murray,Wendy North,Judith Webster,Jerome Harrington,Sid Fletcher,  Joe Scarborough, Pete McKee, the Designers Republic, Thom Wilson ,

... and Street Artists Kid Acne,Marquis deRabbit,Paul Wright,Enso,Caroline McWilliams,Game Over,Dan Rooke,CloquiX,Sage,Trik9,Peachzz,MilaK,Rob Lee,Bubba2000,Phlegm,Affix,Jo Peel,Art and Soul,Mark Mclure,Nicole White,Fem Sorcell,Florence Blanchard (EMA),Faunagraphic,El Guapo.

...Sculptors include George Fullard (1923-1973),Martin Jennings,Steve Mehdi,Jason Heptonsall,Brian Fell,Owen Cunningham,Robin Widdowson,Sarah Beavon,Johnny White,Mike Johnson,

The Man of Steel is a much anticipated future landmark 32 metres high overlooking Sheffield as gateway to the North.Its creator is Steve Mehdi who also designed the Heart of Steel presently sited at Meadowhall but which eventually will be inserted inside the Man of Steel. 

...As a result of a Sheffield Hallam University survey last published in 2012 the following is a list of then known public art comprising in the region of 200 sculptures with names of creators https;//public-art.shu.ac.uk/sheffield/index.html.More recently the charity Wessex Archaeology charity no 287786 and SCO4236 ,www.wessexarch.co.uk, in partnership with Sheffield Visual Arts Group www.sheffieldvisualartsgroup.co.uk ,and a team of volunteers helped to create a free interactive digital map of Sheffield,featuring  over 180 public art works.The map first published on 8th November 2022 is a current work in progress,and subject to further editing and may possibly at a future date incorporate 'art trails' (a walkway through open-air galleries of outdoor sculptures along a defined route). 

Galleries in Sheffield include Millennium Galleries (also containing the Ruskin Gallery), constructed in 2001, the Graves Art Gallery (in the top floor of the Art Deco period building that houses Sheffield Central Library) the Site Gallery (a digital arts media gallery) S1 Artspace,described in an article in the Guardian on 30 December 2011 as ''the hub of the burgeoning art scene in the Steel City which now has the most artists' studios outside London''(then studio rentals were much cheaper,for example  as low as £62 per month, which is no longer the case) Bloc Projects and Sheffield Institute of Arts Gallery (part of Sheffield Hallam University). Weston Park Museum incorporates the Sheffield City Museum and Mappin Art Gallery.

The Site Gallery, along with studios such as Yorkshire ArtSpace and the participatory arts space Access Space, are located in the Cultural Industries Quarter of Sheffield. This area is also home to the Showroom Cinema, Sheffield, an arthouse cinema which occasionally showcases art.

Cupola Contemporary Art Gallery established in 1991 is located in Hillsborough opposite the Leppings Lane tramstop which is on the Middlewood branch of the yellow line.Described by SheffieldMetropolitan.com as the most respected contemporary gallery in the north ,there are sales and exhibitions( new exhibitions every 6 weeks)of fine art and crafts and the gallery represents and shows work by 'over 300 artists.'     

Various initiatives/shows exist throughout the year to showcase the work of local Sheffield, Yorkshire and Derbyshire artists - amateur through to professional. Amongst these are "Open Up Sheffield", "Art in the Gardens" (held in Sheffield Botanical Gardens in September) and the Great Sheffield Art Show, previously held on the first weekend in July at the Octagon Centre in Sheffield, now held later in the year at the Millennium Gallery

Sheffield Museums Trust manages Sheffield City Council's museum collections and are also custodians of the Guild of St George's Ruskin collection and the Ken Hawley Collection,together comprising over a million items of local,regional,national and international significance .The Public Catalogue Foundation,(''the Foundation'')a charity registered numbers 1096185 and SCO 486011, was set up in 2002 to record the entire collection of oil paintings in public ownership in the UK via catalogues sponsored by Christies.The volume relating to the City of Sheffield at 2009 included over 2,400 paintings.In 2011 the Foundation in partnership with the BBC launched a 'Your Paintings' website.This partnership ended in 2016 and in its place Art UK (artuk.org)the operating name of the Foundation announced its purpose ''to complete a digital record of the UK's collection of oils,tempora,acrylic paintings and sculptures and to make it accessible to the public.'' A further  stated aim of Art UK ,subject to funding is to record '' painted murals and Street Art across the UK''(artuk.org)

Sheffield City Council which adopted the Sheffield Culture Collective strategy as an interim measure,(for strategy document see www.sheffield-culture-collective.co.uk),currently have neither its own Cultural Strategy (nor Public Art Strategy) ,nor the resources to prepare such strategies; but on the positive side funding is in place and tenders have been sent out to engage external sources/experts to prepare/ report and make recommendations to Sheffield City Council on the foregoing i.e. a Culture Strategy, by Autumn 2023 .The Sheffield City Council in 2022 recognised and agreed the four 'priority' 'immediate capital projects' set  out in the Sheffield City Culture Strategy(the Collective having been formed in 2019, in response to recommendations of Core Cities Cultural Cities Enquiry 2019 ), namely Tinsley Art Project,(four 100 feet chimneys designed by Alex Chinnock,the sculptures to be seen from the M1 motorway as 'the gateway to the North' ),Park Hill Art Space (a national flagship project and 'anchor institution of Park Hill's £100 million Urban Splash and Partners for Peoples regeneration,featuring art gallery,work space for artists and creative businesses ,learning and community space,heritage flats,etc.''surrounded by a 6 acre sculpture park''), Harmony Works (a £12 million Gateway Levelling Up funded project to transform the grade 2 listed Victorian building Canada House on Commercial Street Sheffield S1 into a music centre for young people due to open in 2006)..and Graves Gallery and Central Library(Sheffield City Council is aware that the exterior of the 3 storey 'art deco' building erected in 1934 ,at  67-69 Surrey Street ,Sheffield S1 1XZ,( housing both Graves gallery and Central Library )is ''crumbling'' .

The 2022/3 planning application for the transformation of Castle Street includes new public art and Sheffield City Council as added attraction want to expose part of the castle and the river Sheaf .

The Pounds Park project at the heart of the heart of the city is a programme of work and construction being carried out by Henry Boot Limited which company also funded the public art content of the project .

In February 2023 the Sheffield City Council adopted 'the Heritage Strategy for Sheffield 2021-2031'' submitted to the Council by Joined Up Heritage Sheffield (a charity registered no1180945 formed in 2018 ) 

Reporting on Arts Council funding the Sheffield Star newspaper on 13th November 2022 publicised that Sheffield had received ''only a fraction of the money given to northern cities by the Arts Council'' Details of Art Council grants across the country allocated for 2023-2026, showed that Sheffield receives only £6.23 per head of population (£3.4 million in total) compared to Manchester £44.41,Leeds£35.65 and Newcastle £29.74 per person.The Arts Council makes funding decisions for National Portfolio Organisations (NPOS). Existing Sheffield art organisations which were NPOS prior to November 2022, were not disinvested ,but a number of Sheffield art organisations/ studios were unsuccessful in  their applications for NPOS funding.At 1st January 2023 the list of Sheffield art related NPOS are AA2A (Arts Access to Colleges),Arts Catalyst,Parents in Performing Arts (a new entrant),Sheffield Museums Trust and Yorkshire Artspace.Tyler Mellins a member of Shefield Visual Arts Panel (set up to implement the vision for visual arts set out in Making Ways 2019-2024)stated that Sheffield is packed full of amazing artists but there isn't enough support and our own art organisations are underfunded    

Sheffield is also home to two universities, one of which Sheffield Hallam University, has a Fine Arts department formerly based at Psalter Lane which relocated to Sheffield City Centre in 2008.Fine Arts graduates from Sheffield Hallam University include Rosalind Nashshibi (Turner Prize nominee in 2017),Jamie Crewe (Turner Prize nominee and one of its bursary winners in 2020),Conor Rogers (1st prize winner of Robert Walters Group sponsored UK Young Artist of the Year in 2019),Lynn Hodnett (winner of British Airways Young Achievers in Art  award resulting in a commission for a 8'x5' painting at Heathrow Airport)Manish Harijan (winner of the Dianne Willcocks Lifelong Learning award on award of Masters degree in 2019),Dr Eleanor Gates-Stuart (Taiwan and Australia professorships in technology and art).

References?)

Arts in Sheffield
Sheffield
Sheffield